The Pointe d'Aveneyre (2,026 m) is a mountain of the Swiss Prealps, located east of Villeneuve in the canton of Vaud. It lies south of the Rochers de Naye, on the range overlooking Lake Geneva.

References

External links

 Pointe d'Aveneyre on Hikr

Two-thousanders of Switzerland
Mountains of the Alps
Mountains of the canton of Vaud
Mountains of Switzerland